is a professor of philosophy at Rhode Island School of Design (RISD). Saito joined the faculty at RISD in 1981 and was the head of the Special Studies department from 1989 to 1992. Saito was born in raised in Sapporo, Japan and attended International Christian University (ICU) in Tokyo, where she received a Bachelor of Arts degree. She then attended the University of Wisconsin–Madison for graduate school and received a PhD in Philosophy with a minor in Japanese literature. Saito received the RISD Frazier Award for Excellence in Teaching in 1999. She serves on the editorial board for Environmental Aesthetics, is Editor of the online journal Contemporary Aesthetics, is an editorial consultant for The British Journal of Aesthetics, and was a trustee member for the American Society for Aesthetics. She has many publications in the fields of everyday aesthetics, environmental aesthetics, and Japanese aesthetics, and has written and reviewed numerous book chapters. A relevant book publication, Everyday Aesthetics was released in 2008 (the paperback edition in 2010) by Oxford University Press, followed by Aesthetics of the Familiar: Everyday Life and World-Making (Oxford University Press, 2017). She has presented at University of Houston, Babson College, Baruch College, University of Montana at Missoula, Hampshire College in Massachusetts, University of Texas at Austin, as well as at various locations in the U.S., Japan, and Finland. Saito currently resides in Rhode Island with her family.

References 

University of Wisconsin–Madison College of Letters and Science alumni
Rhode Island School of Design faculty
Living people
Year of birth missing (living people)